Greshicë is a village and a former municipality in the Fier County, southwestern Albania. At the 2015 local government reform, it became a subdivision of the municipality Mallakastër. The population as recorded in the 2011 census was 1,152.

History 
In 1847, Albanian rebels under Rrapo Hekali defeated Ottoman forces in Greshicë during the Albanian revolt of 1847 executing Isuf Bey Vrioni and his brother.

References

Former municipalities in Fier County
Administrative units of Mallakastër
Villages in Fier County